Nepal national blind cricket team represents Nepal at blind cricket. The team has been run and governed by the Cricket Association for the Blind in Nepal (CAB NEP). Nepal blind cricket team made its first appearance in a Blind T20 World Cup tournament during the 2017 Blind T20 World Cup. In the 2017 Blind T20 World Cup, Nepal cricket team managed to beat South Africa and New Zealand.

The blind cricket team qualified to play in the 2018 Blind Cricket World Cup, which was also its first ever appearance in a Blind Cricket World Cup tournament. However, the team was knocked out of the tournament with its only victory against Australia in the group stage match.

Tournament history

Blind T20 World Cup 
2012-Groupstage

2017-Groupstage

40 Over Blind Cricket World Cup 
2018-Groupstage

References 

Blind cricket teams
C
Parasports in Nepal
2017 establishments in Nepal